Portland Memorial Mausoleum Mural is a 2009 mural by Dan Cohen of ArtFX Murals and Shane Bennett, painted at Wilhelm's Portland Memorial Funeral Home (also known as the Portland Memorial Mausoleum Chapel) in Portland, Oregon's Sellwood neighborhood, in the United States. It was an expansion of the Great Blue Heron Mural, which is seen on the building's lower west facing wall and was also applied by ArtFX Murals.

Description
The expanded latex painting, located at Wilhelm's Portland Memorial Funeral Home (also known as the Portland Memorial Mausoleum Chapel; 6705 Southeast 14th Avenue) covers approximately 43,485 square feet across eight surfaces and is among the largest murals in the United States. It is visible from the Springwater Corridor and Interstate 5 and was funded by the Public Art Murals Program and private donors.

According to the Regional Arts & Culture Council, which administers the work, the mural "highlights the importance of the 160-acre Oaks Bottom Wildlife Refuge to the city of Portland's quality of life, the contribution of the wetland system as a critical element of the city's green infrastructure, and its contribution to maintaining biodiversity in the city and metropolitan area".

See also
 2009 in art
 Woodstock Mural, a Portland mural reproduced by Dan Cohen

References

External links

 
 
 
 

2000s murals
2009 establishments in Oregon
2009 paintings
Birds in art
Murals in Oregon
Paintings in Portland, Oregon
Sellwood-Moreland, Portland, Oregon